The Nieuwspoort (English: News gate) is a society catering to Dutch politicians, lobbyists and journalists so they can informally meet. It's also a place where press conferences from politicians (most notably the Prime Minister of the Netherlands' weekly address) are held.

History
The press centre was opened in 1962 by Jo Cals. Many notable incidents took place here, including the pieing incident during the book release of Pim Fortuyn's De puinhopen van acht jaar Paars and Ayaan Hirsi Ali's retirement announcement.

References

External links

Organisations based in The Hague